

Irish and American republicans in mid-19th century Victoria

During the 19th-century gold rush, the 1861 Victorian census showed nearly 16 per cent of the colony's population was made up of 87,160 Irish-born persons. During the years of convict transportation and assisted emigrants, up to 17.4 per cent of the convicts were Irish, and incentives to live in Australia offered between 1839 and 1851 were taken up by 28,900 Irish natives. Carboni recalls that the Eureka lead was an Irish stronghold and the miners were a "rowdy mob." There were tensions between groups of English and Irish miners.

Among the other national flags on display at the public meetings held around the time of the rebellion were those of North American design, with Canada and most importantly the United States, being countries that included a large number of the Irish diaspora. Vern recalls that during his time in the colony: "Ballaarat was always the rallying point of the Americans."

Ian MacFarlane notes that along with some other nationalities, the Americans were treated with suspicion and regarded as republicans at a time when Britain and the US were in an adversarial relationship. In the period 1851–1856, approximately 16,000 US nationals left for Australia. By 1854, most Americans in Victoria were occupying the goldfields. Beginning in 1853, the number of US flag carriers entering Port Phillip increased from 13 to 134 in 1854, when US imports equalled 1,668,606 pounds.

In August 1852, the British consul in Philadelphia advised the British foreign secretary that the American emigrates were likely to be hostile to the British crown, saying:

The American consul sought permission from the Victorian authorities to mark Independence Day in 1853 by firing a national salute. LaTrobe forwarded the request to the mayor of Melbourne who replied that:

In October 1853, a British official in Washington DC was told that "a revolution in Australia, by which its connection with Great Britain should be severed, would be an event highly acceptable to the great mass of the American people."

The Irish in America, in particular, were "hereditary enemies of Great Britain." Many of the Irish who joined the Victorian gold rush came via California, where gold deposits were found in 1849, and had memories of the 1846-1847 potato famine - during which time Ireland was a net exporter of food.

Of the Americans on the gold fields, Clive Turnbull states:

Alleged declaration of independence

Upon the Ballarat Reform League charter becoming the first item added to the Victorian Heritage Register, Premier Steve Bracks claimed the document was a landmark in the history of Australia, making the comparison: "It is our Declaration of Independence. Our Magna Carta." The editor of the Ballarat Times, Henry Seekamp, writing in 1854, would greet the formation of the League with the bold assertion:

However, during the Eureka trials, it was put to Seekamp that he was a "radical" who was "rousing up the people," and he may have been prone to radical nationalist hyperbole. Raffaello Carboni would later say that "Indeed, it would ill become the Times to mince in a matter of such weighty importance. This League is not more or less than the germ of Australian independence."

H.R. Nicholls recalls that "some of the Irish took to rebellion as ducks to water, as did sundry foreigners who were fresh from European revolutions [of 1848]."

The reform league charter contains a hint that the movement contained those who favoured independence, stating that:

Although the charter was framed in these terms, there have been no discoveries made, nor is there any clear and convincing evidence as to the existence of such a formal declaration of independence made at a later stage of the Eureka Rebellion.

Nicholls claimed, at the time of the death of Peter Lalor in 1890, that the already long deceased Alfred Black drew up a "long, very long, very flowery and decidedly verbose...Declaration of Independence...This declaration was read at night-fall on the Friday, I think, to a number of persons under arms, various kinds of arms, and was cheered very loudly."

William Withers says such a declaration was made at the premises of shopkeeper Teddy Shannahan and in the presence of Black, Vern, McGill, Raffaello, Curtin, Lessman, Kenworthy, and others. Carboni wrote that McGill described claims of such a declaration on the model of the American one being made as "a gratuitous falsehood," issuing an invitation to anyone to produce "the document in question, either the original or copy of it, of course with satisfactory evidence of its being a genuine article." Nicholls had probably made pre-existing claims about a declaration of independence and was possibly the unnamed source in Wither's account, with Carboni saying: "I express the hope that H.R. Nicholls...will take notice of the above."

There may have been a declaration of independence drawn up by someone associated with the Eureka movement, but without official sanction and known only to a few people in one of the factions, which had been known to act of their own initiative without any other, or even the central committee, being aware. However, the only other corroboration is also of questionable probative value. George Train, an American merchant, recalls in 1901 that McGill came to him seeking supplies of Colt revolvers, saying: "We have elected you President of our Republic." Train says he declined the opportunity to become involved but that he did help the fugitive McGill make his escape from Victoria.  It was said that starting in about 1873, Train became noted for his eccentricities, becoming known as the "champion crank of America." Whilst Train may have assisted McGill to escape, claims that McGill approached him for weapons and offered him the "presidency" of the "Five-Star Republic" are to be treated with suspicion. L.G. Churchward has judged that Train's story "is most improbable" and that:

Clive Turnbull concludes that Train's version of events "is probable enough." However, Turnbull then mentions Train's "strange statement that 'the miners about Maryborough' elected him as their representative in the colonial legislature." Other historians have dismissed both Train's "presidency" and "colonial legislature" claims as "unsubstantiated."

Nicholls recalls that when asked what he stood for, Lalor would say,"'Independence!' Plump and plain." However, according to an analysis of Lalor's record, "if this were so, it would seem that the independence he wanted was from arbitrary rule, from encroachments by the Crown on 'British Liberty,' and that granted by access to the land, rather than the 'independence' of a republican democracy." Daniel and Annette Potts state that: "Lalor consistently denied that he had meant independence outside the framework of the existing government." Nicholls reiterates by saying, "I repeat, that the late leader of the rebel forces went in for independence, with a very large I; although afterwards, when other prospects opened up, the fact was denied in a faint hearted sort of a way."

Peter Lalor's father, Patrick, who once represented Queen's County in the British parliament, was a supporter of Irish home rule. Older brother James Fintian considered Queen Victoria to be a "foreign tyrant" and was an influential leader in the Young Ireland Movement, which advocated a holistic approach to national revival, with certain other members making headlines after being involved in a car chase and shootout with the Royal Irish Constabulary in 1848.

According to William Craig, the future Eureka man was already well versed in politics at the time of his arrival in the colony. Lalor took a hard line on the Irish question, believing the people of his homeland were being denied nationhood and supporting their right to continue the armed struggle against British colonial rule. Charles Currey's assessment of Lalor is that he generally "preferred to take the world as he found it, content if he was given a fair deal and not provoked by tyranny."

References

Bibliography

Historiography

Local histories

Social histories

Biography

Primary sources

Memoirs

 
 
 Nicholls, H.R (May 1890). Reminiscences of the Eureka Stockade. The Centennial Magazine: An Australian Monthly. II: August 1889 to July 1890 (available in an annual compilation).
 
 Vern, Fredrick, 'Narrative of the Ballarat Insurrection', Melbourne Monthly Magazine, November 1855.

Other documents

 Ballarat Reform League Charter, 11 November 1854, VPRS 4066/P Unit 1, November no. 69, VA 466 Governor (including Lieutenant Governor 1851–1855 and Governor's Office), Public Record Office Victoria.

Journals

Historical magazines

 

1854 in Australia
19th-century rebellions
History of Ballarat
Australian folklore
History of Victoria (Australia)
19th century in Victoria (Australia)
Riots and civil disorder in Victoria (Australia)
Rebellions against the British Empire
Rebellions in Australia
Political history of Australia
Protests in Australia
History of Australia (1851–1900)
19th-century reform movements
1854 riots
Conflicts in 1854
Resistance to colonialism in Australia
Chartism
December 1854 events